The Pharr–Reynosa International Bridge is an international bridge across the Rio Grande, along the U.S.–Mexico border. It connects the city of Pharr in the U.S. state of Texas with the city of Reynosa in the Mexican state of Tamaulipas. On the U.S. side, the bridge connects to U.S. Route 281 via Texas State Highway Spur 600. On the Mexico side, it provides access to Mexican Federal Highway 2. The bridge handles both commercial and passenger vehicles. Since 1996, all trucks have been diverted here from the McAllen–Hidalgo–Reynosa International Bridge, which is located upriver to the west.

Border crossing

The Pharr Texas Port of Entry is located at the Pharr–Reynosa International Bridge. The bridge opened in 1994, and since 1996, northbound trucks from Reynosa have not been to permitted to cross at the Hidalgo Texas Port of Entry.

See also
 Anzalduas International Bridge — next Reynosa + McAllen road bridge upriver-west.
 McAllen–Hidalgo–Reynosa International Bridge — next downriver between the cities.

References

International bridges in Tamaulipas
International bridges in Texas
Road bridges in Texas
Toll bridges in Mexico
Toll bridges in Texas
Pharr, Texas
Reynosa
Bridges of the United States Numbered Highway System
Buildings and structures in Hidalgo County, Texas
Transportation in Hidalgo County, Texas
Transportation in McAllen, Texas